Frederick Cuthbert may refer to:

 Frederick Cuthbert (cricketer) (1800–1821), English amateur cricketer
 Frederick Alexander Cuthbert (1902–1978), American landscape architect
 Frederick William Cuthbert (1850s–1948), grocer and miner in Croydon, Queensland, Australia